The 11th International 500-Mile Sweepstakes Race was held at the Indianapolis Motor Speedway on Wednesday, May 30, 1923. After winning previously in 1921, Tommy Milton became the first multiple winner of the Indianapolis 500. Howdy Wilcox (the 1919 winner) drove relief for Milton in laps 103–151. During the break, Milton had to have his hands bandaged due to blisters, and changed his shoes due to crimping of his toes.

On lap 22, Tom Alley (driving Earl Cooper's entry) wrecked on the backstretch, going through the wall, and killed 16-year-old spectator Bert Shoup. Alley and two other spectators were injured.

Memorial Day controversy
In January 1923, about four months before the race, the Indiana Legislature passed a bill prohibiting commercialized sporting events, including the Indianapolis 500, from being held on Memorial Day. Some veterans groups, and proponents of the measure, led by senator Robert L. Moorhead, were displeased with the way the holiday had become "...a day for games, races, and revelry, instead of a day of memory and tears". The bill sparked a heated debate, whereby the local American Legion issued a public proclamation opposing the law, on the grounds of free expression, and being "un-American" in principle.

The issue created a potential schedule shake-up, which could have moved the race to the proceeding Saturday (May 26), or forced an outright cancellation. Speedway management was leery about permanently moving the race to a Saturday, since many spectators worked on Saturdays, and they preferred to have the race on a holiday. Officials in the city of Indianapolis even proposed making the Saturday before Memorial Day a city holiday, to ensure the race was held on a holiday. On March 5, after consulting legal experts, Governor Warren T. McCray vetoed the bill, calling it "class legislation" and therefore unconstitutional.

Time trials
Four-lap (10 mile) qualifying runs were utilized. Tommy Milton won the pole with a record speed of over 108mph. Five cars qualified with average speeds of over 100mph.

Results

Race details
Note above Joe Boyer's car # was 4. Dario Resta was car #3.
For 1923, riding mechanics were made optional. Only one team (the Mercedes of Christian Lautenschlager) utilized one.
First alternate: none

References

Indianapolis 500 races
Indianapolis 500
Indianapolis 500
Indianapolis 500
Indianapolis 500